Fitzwilliam railway station is in the village of Fitzwilliam, West Yorkshire, England. It is also the closest station to the nearby town of Hemsworth.

The station is on the Wakefield Line operated by Northern. Trains run from Fitzwilliam  to Leeds via Wakefield Westgate, Doncaster and Sheffield.

The current station was opened on 1 March 1982 as one of series of improvements to local rail services made by the West Yorkshire PTE (Passenger Transport Executive). This replaced the LNER station several hundred metres to the north, which opened as "Fitzwilliam Halt" on 1 July 1937 but fell victim to the Beeching cuts within little more than 30 years, closing on 6 November 1967.  Unlike its modern incarnation, the original station consisted of a single island platform, accessed from the adjacent road bridge. The line was electrified in 1988.

Facilities
The station is unstaffed and has two wooden platforms, with waiting shelters on each side.  There is a ticket machine in place to allow intending passengers to buy these prior to boarding or collect advance purchase tickets.  A customer help point is located on platform 2 and running information is also provided by means of digital CIS displays, timetable posters and automated train announcements.  Step-free access to both platforms is possible via ramps from the main road.

Services
On Monday to Saturdays, a half-hourly service operates towards Wakefield Westgate and Leeds and an hourly service operates both to Doncaster and to Sheffield.

On Sundays, the same frequency operates as during the week (since the May 2019 timetable change), but starting later in the day.

References

External links

Railway stations in Wakefield
DfT Category F1 stations
Former London and North Eastern Railway stations
Railway stations in Great Britain opened in 1937
Railway stations in Great Britain closed in 1967
Railway stations in Great Britain opened in 1982
Northern franchise railway stations
Beeching closures in England
1937 establishments in England
Hemsworth